Elections were held on 6 May 1999 to elect 65 local councillors for Bath and North East Somerset Council, the second election for the council. The results are show below. After the election, a minority Liberal Democrat administration was formed.

Election results

Ward results
The ward results listed below are based on the changes from the 1995 elections where boundary changes have not taken place, not taking into account any party defections or by-elections. Sitting councillors are marked with an asterisk (*).

Abbey

Bathavon North

Bathavon South

Bathavon West

Bathwick

Chew Valley North

Chew Valley South

Clutton

Combe Down

Farmborough

High Littleton

Keynsham East

Keynsham North

Keynsham South

Kingsmead

Lambridge

Lansdown

Lyncombe

Mendip

Midsomer Norton North

Midsomer Norton Redfield

Newbridge

Odd Down

Oldfield

Paulton

Peasedown

Publow with Whitchurch

Radstock

Saltford

Southdown

Timsbury

Twerton

Walcot

Westfield

Westmoreland

Weston

Widcombe

By-elections between 1999 and 2003

Lansdown

Bathavon North

Lansdown

Walcot

References
General

Specific

1999 English local elections
1999
1990s in Somerset